Scooby-Doo! Haunted Holidays is the second Direct-to-DVD special based upon the Scooby-Doo Saturday morning cartoons as a Christmas special, released on October 16, 2012 on the 13 Spooky Tales: Holiday Chills and Thrills DVD. It premiered on Cartoon Network on December 4, 2012.

Plot
The gang is enjoying a winter festival, when a living snowman arrives and chases everyone off. Curious, the gang decides to investigate in a nearby toy factory, which hides a deadly secret. The gang soon finds out they are trapped inside of the toy store, because the snowman is waiting for them outside. They then meet the owner, Fabian Menkle, who explains to them about the store's haunted clock tower and that the Menkle family toy store was cursed a long time ago by the Sinister Snowman. Later, the snowman is able to get inside the factory and tries to chase Shaggy and Scooby. Just when they think they are doomed, the real Santa Claus shows up, and gets the haunted clock tower working again, which had not been working for many centuries. The snowman is melted by the loud clock tower, and is found out to be none other than Fabian Menkle himself, who was trying to rob the toy store of its money. He tried to make his uncle look crazy so he could sell the store and get the money.

Cast
 Frank Welker as Scooby-Doo, Fred Jones
 Matthew Lillard as Shaggy Rogers
 Mindy Cohn as Velma Dinkley
 Grey DeLisle as Daphne Blake
 Carlos Alazraqui as Havros Menkle, Janitor
 Crispin Freeman as Fabian Menkle
 Fred Tatasciore as Santa Claus actor, real Santa Claus, Sinister Snowman

See also
 Santa Claus in film

References

External links
 
 Amazon

Scooby-Doo specials
American television films
2012 films
Santa Claus in film
Santa Claus in television
2010s American animated films
Warner Bros. Animation animated films
Warner Bros. direct-to-video animated films
Christmas television films
Animated direct-to-video specials
Films directed by Victor Cook
2010s English-language films